Michael Martin Fried (born April 12, 1939 in New York City) is a modernist art critic and art historian. He studied at Princeton University and Harvard University and was a Rhodes Scholar at Merton College, Oxford. He is the J.R. Herbert Boone Professor Emeritus of Humanities and Art History at the Johns Hopkins University, Baltimore, Maryland, United States.

Fried's contribution to art historical discourse involved the debate over the origins and development of modernism. Along with Fried, this debate's interlocutors include other theorists and critics such as Clement Greenberg, T. J. Clark, and Rosalind Krauss.  Since the early 1960s, he has also been close to philosopher Stanley Cavell.

Fried was elected to the American Academy of Arts and Sciences in 1985 and the American Philosophical Society in 2003.

Early career
Fried describes his early career in the introduction to Art and Objecthood: Essays and Reviews (1998), an anthology of his art criticism in the 60s and 70s. Although he majored in English at Princeton it was there that he became interested in writing art criticism. While at Princeton he met the artist Frank Stella and through him Walter Darby Bannard. In 1958, he wrote a letter to Clement Greenberg expressing his admiration for his writing and first met him in the Spring of that year. In September 1958, he moved to Oxford, Ruskin School of Drawing and Fine Art, and then to London in 1961–62, where he studied philosophy part-time at University College, London (UCL), under Stuart Hampshire and Richard Wollheim. In 1961 Hilton Kramer offered him the post of London correspondent for the journal Arts. In the fall of 1961, Fried began his friendship with the sculptor Anthony Caro, who invited him to write the introduction to his Whitechapel Art Gallery exhibition in 1963.

In 1962 Fried had a short collection of eight poems ("In Other Hands") published by Fantasy Press in Oxford, the first of others to come. In the late summer of that year, he returned to the U.S, where he combined studying for a Ph.D in art history at Harvard with writing art criticism, initially for Art International, and curating the exhibition Three American painters: Kenneth Noland, Jules Olitski, Frank Stella at Harvard's Fogg Art Museum.

"Art and Objecthood"
In his essay, "Art and Objecthood," published in 1967, Fried argued that Minimalism's focus on the viewer's experience, rather than the relational properties of the work of art exemplified by modernism, made the work of art indistinguishable from one's general experience of the world. Minimalism (or "literalism" as Fried called it) offered an experience of "theatricality" or "presence" rather than "presentness" (a condition that required continual renewal). The essay inadvertently opened the door to establishing a theoretical basis for Minimalism as a movement based in a conflicting mode of phenomenological experience than the one offered by Fried.

Discussing its upcoming publication in a 1967 letter to Philip Leider, editor of Artforum (which published the essay), Fried wrote: "I keep toying with the idea, crazy as it sounds, of having a section in this sculpture-theater essay on how corrupt sensibility is par excellence faggot sensibility."

Absorption and Theatricality

In "Art and Objecthood" Fried criticized the "theatricality" of Minimalist art. He introduced the opposing term "absorption" in his 1980 book, Absorption and Theatricality: Painting and Beholder in the Age of Diderot.  Drawing on Diderot's criticism, Fried argues that whenever a self-consciousness of viewing exists, absorption is compromised, and theatricality results. As well as applying the distinction to 18th-century painting, Fried employs related categories in his art criticism of post-1945 American painting and sculpture. Fried rejects the effort by some critics to conflate his art-critical and art-historical writing.

Fried revisits some of these concerns in a study of recent photography with Why Photography Matters as Art as Never Before (London and New Haven 2008). In a reading of works by prominent art photographers of the last 20 years (Bernd and Hilla Becher, Jeff Wall, Andreas Gursky, Thomas Demand among others) Fried asserts that concerns of anti-theatricality and absorption are central to the turn by recent photographers towards large-scale works "for the wall.".

Selected bibliography
In more recent years, Fried has written several long and complex histories of modern art, most famously on Édouard Manet, Gustave Courbet, Adolph Menzel, and painting in the late 18th century.

 Absorption and Theatricality: Painting and Beholder in the Age of Diderot Berkeley: University of California Press, 1980. Awarded 1980 Gottschalk Prize.
 Realism, Writing, Disfiguration: On Thomas Eakins and Stephen Crane Chicago and London: University of Chicago Press, 1987. Awarded 1990 Charles C. Eldredge Prize.
 Courbet's Realism Chicago and London: University of Chicago Press, 1990.
 Manet's Modernism Chicago and London: University of Chicago Press, 1996. French translation awarded 2000 Prix Littéraire Etats-Unis.
 Art and Objecthood: Essays and Reviews Chicago and London: University of Chicago Press, 1998.
 Menzel's Realism: Art and Embodiment in Nineteenth-Century Berlin London and New Haven: Yale University Press, 2002.
 Why Photography Matters as Art as Never Before London and New Haven: Yale University Press, 2008.
 The Moment of Caravaggio Princeton University Press, 2010.
 Four Honest Outlaws: Sala, Ray, Marioni, Gordon London and New Haven: Yale University Press, 2011.
 Flaubert's "Gueuloir": On Madame Bovary and Salammbô London and New Haven: Yale University Press, 2012.
 Another Light: Jacques-Louis David to Thomas Demand London and New Haven: Yale University Press, 2014.
 After Caravaggio London and New Haven: Yale University Press, 2016.
What Was Literary Impressionism? Cambridge, Mass. and London: Harvard University Press, 2018.

Fried is also a poet, having written The Next Bend in the Road, Powers, To the Center of the Earth, and Promesse du Bonheur.

References

Further reading
 Michael Fried at Johns Hopkins University
 Arni Haraldsson Fried’s Turn. Fillip. Book Review. 2010
 A short interview at Johns Hopkins Magazine
 'Internal Structures of Meaning', review of The Moment of Caravaggio in the Oxonian Review
 Geoff Dyer on Michael Fried in the New York Times Book Review, 24 July 2011

1939 births
Living people
Alumni of Merton College, Oxford
Alumni of University College London
American art historians
American art critics
University of Illinois College of Liberal Arts and Sciences alumni
Princeton University alumni
Johns Hopkins University faculty
American Rhodes Scholars
Corresponding Fellows of the British Academy
Members of the American Philosophical Society
Harvard Graduate School of Arts and Sciences alumni